Tlahualilo de Zaragoza is a city located in the northeastern part of the Mexican state of Durango. Tlahualilo of Zaragoza is the municipal seat of the Tlahualilo municipio. As of 2010, the city had a population of 9,517.  The city is part of the Comarca Lagunera metropolitan area, which has a population totalling more than 912,000 inhabitants in 2005. The municipality has a population of 22,244 and borders the state of Coahuila in the east, the municipality of Mapimí to the west and the city of Gómez Palacio to the south.

References

Tlah